The Woman and the Puppet (French: La femme et le pantin) is a 1929 French silent drama film directed by Jacques de Baroncelli and starring Conchita Montenegro,  and Henri Lévêque. It is an adaptation of the novel of the same name by Pierre Louÿs. and the play of the same name by Pierre Frondaie.

Cast
Conchita Montenegro as Conchita 
 as Don Mateo 
Henri Lévêque as André Stinvenol 
Jean Dalbe as Morenito 
Andrée Canti as Woman in Train 
Léo Joannon as Don Mateo's Friend

References

External links

1920s color films
Films directed by Jacques de Baroncelli
French silent feature films
French drama films
1929 drama films
Pathé films
French black-and-white films
Films based on works by Pierre Louÿs
Silent drama films
1920s French films
1920s French-language films